Carte Said Mhando, known as Carte Said (born 15 April 1997) is an Italian football player. He plays for Swiss club Chiasso. He is of Tanzanian descent.

Club career
He made his Serie B debut for Brescia on 30 April 2016 in a game against Vicenza.

On 1 August 2019, he signed a 2-year contract with Serie C club Fano.

On 27 January 2021 he moved to Foggia.

On 11 July 2021, he returned to Chiasso.

References

External links
 

1997 births
People from Pozzuoli
Footballers from Campania
Living people
Tanzanian footballers
Italian footballers
Association football midfielders
Brescia Calcio players
FC Chiasso players
A.C. Cuneo 1905 players
Alma Juventus Fano 1906 players
Calcio Foggia 1920 players
Serie B players
Serie C players
Swiss Challenge League players
Tanzanian expatriate footballers
Expatriate footballers in Switzerland
Italian people of Tanzanian descent
Italian sportspeople of African descent